In algebraic geometry, Behrend's trace formula is a generalization of the Grothendieck–Lefschetz trace formula to a smooth algebraic stack over a finite field, conjectured in 1993  and proven in 2003  by Kai Behrend. Unlike the classical one, the formula counts points in the "stacky way"; it takes into account the presence of nontrivial automorphisms.

The desire for the formula comes from the fact that it applies to the moduli stack of principal bundles on a curve over a finite field (in some instances indirectly, via the Harder–Narasimhan stratification, as the moduli stack is not of finite type.) See the moduli stack of principal bundles and references therein for the precise formulation in this case.

Pierre Deligne found an example that shows the formula may be interpreted as a sort of the Selberg trace formula.

A proof of the formula in the context of the six operations formalism developed by Yves Laszlo and Martin Olsson is given by Shenghao Sun.

Formulation 

with the sum running over representatives p of all isomorphism classes in C. (The series may diverge in general.) The formula states: for a smooth algebraic stack X of finite type over a finite field  and the "arithmetic" Frobenius , i.e., the inverse of the usual geometric Frobenius  in Grothendieck's formula,

Here, it is crucial that the cohomology of a stack is with respect to the smooth topology (not etale).

When X is a variety, the smooth cohomology is the same as etale one and, via the Poincaré duality, this is equivalent to Grothendieck's trace formula. (But the proof of Behrend's trace formula relies on Grothendieck's formula, so this does not subsume Grothendieck's.)

Simple example 
Consider , the classifying stack of the multiplicative group scheme (that is).

On the other hand, we may compute the l-adic cohomology of  directly. We remark that in the topological setting, we have  (where  now denotes the usual classifying space of a topological group), whose rational cohomology ring is a polynomial ring in one generator (Borel's theorem), but we shall not use this directly. If we wish to stay in the world of algebraic geometry, we may instead "approximate"  by projective spaces of larger and larger dimension. Thus  we consider the map  induced by the -bundle corresponding to  This map induces an isomorphism in cohomology in degrees up to 2N. This shows that

Note that

Notes

References 

Theorems in algebraic geometry